Jack Leroy Wilson Jr. (June 9, 1934 – January 21, 1984) was an American singer and performer of the 1950s and 60s. He was a prominent figure in the transition of rhythm and blues into soul. Nicknamed "Mr. Excitement", he was considered a master showman and one of the most dynamic singers and performers in soul, R&B, and rock and roll history.

Wilson gained initial fame as a member of the R&B vocal group Billy Ward and His Dominoes. He went solo in 1957 and scored over 50 chart singles spanning the genres of R&B, pop, soul, doo-wop, and easy listening. This included 16 Top 10 R&B hits, six of which ranked as number ones. On the Billboard Hot 100, Wilson scored 14 top 20 pop hits, six of which reached the top 10.

Wilson was posthumously inducted to the Rock and Roll Hall of Fame in 1987. He is also inducted into the National Rhythm & Blues Hall of Fame. Two of Wilson's recordings were inducted into the Grammy Hall of Fame in 1999. He was honored with the Rhythm and Blues Foundation's Legacy Tribute Award in 2003.  In 2004, Rolling Stone magazine ranked Wilson No. 69 on its list of the 100 Greatest Artists of All Time, and number 26 as one of the greatest singers of all time.

Life and career

Early years 
Jack Leroy Wilson Jr. was born on June 9, 1934, in Highland Park, Michigan, as the third and only surviving child of singer Jack Leroy Wilson, Sr. (1903–1983) and Eliza Mae Wilson (1900–1975). Eliza Mae was born on the Billups-Whitfield Place in Lowndes County, Mississippi. Eliza Mae's parents were Tom and Virginia Ransom. Wilson often visited his family in Columbus and was greatly influenced by the choir at Billups Chapel. Growing up in the suburban Detroit enclave of Highland Park, Wilson joined a gang called the Shakers and often got himself in trouble. Wilson's alcoholic father was frequently absent and usually unemployed. In 1943, his parents separated shortly after Jackie's ninth birthday.

Jackie Wilson began singing as a youth, accompanying his mother, an experienced church choir singer. In his early teens he joined a quartet, the Ever Ready Gospel Singers, who gained popularity in local churches. Wilson was not very religious, but he enjoyed singing in public. The money the quartet earned from performing was often spent on alcohol, and Wilson began drinking at an early age.

Wilson dropped out of high school at age 15, having been sentenced twice to detention in the Lansing Corrections system for juveniles. During his second stint in detention, Wilson learned to box and began competing in the Detroit amateur circuit at age 16. Wilson's record in the Golden Gloves was 2 and 8. After his mother forced Jackie to quit boxing, Wilson was forced to marry Freda Hood by her father after getting her pregnant, and he became a father at age 17.

Early career 
He began working at Lee's Sensation Club as a solo singer, then formed a group called the Falcons that included cousin Levi Stubbs, who later led the Four Tops. (Two other Wilson cousins, Hubert Johnson and Levi's brother Joe, later became members of the Contours.) The other Falcons joined Hank Ballard as part of the Midnighters, including Alonzo Tucker and Billy Davis, who worked with Wilson several years later as a solo artist. Tucker and Wilson collaborated as songwriters on a few songs Wilson recorded, including his 1963 hit "Baby Workout".

Wilson was discovered by talent agent Johnny Otis, who recruited him for a group called the Thrillers. That group evolved into the Royals (who later became R&B group, the Midnighters, though Wilson was not part of the group when it changed its name and signed with King Records). Wilson signed on with manager Al Green (not to be confused with R&B singer Al Green, nor Albert "Al" Green of the now defunct National Records). Green, who also managed LaVern Baker, Little Willie John, Johnnie Ray and Della Reese, owned two music publishing companies, Pearl Music and Merrimac Music, and Detroit's Flame Show Bar, where Wilson met Baker.

After Wilson recorded his first version of "Danny Boy" and a few other tracks on Dizzy Gillespie's record label Dee Gee Records under the name Sonny Wilson (his nickname), Wilson eventually was hired by Billy Ward in 1953 to join a group Ward formed in 1950 called the Dominoes, after Wilson's successful audition to replace the immensely popular Clyde McPhatter, who left the Dominoes and formed the Drifters. Wilson almost blew his chance that day, showing up calling himself "The shit" Wilson and bragging about being a better singer than McPhatter.

Billy Ward felt a stage name would better fit the Dominoes' image, hence Jackie Wilson. Before leaving the Dominoes, McPhatter coached Wilson on the sound Billy Ward wanted for his group, influencing Wilson's singing style and stage presence. "I learned a lot from Clyde, that high-pitched choke he used and other things...Clyde McPhatter was my man. Clyde and Billy Ward." 1940s blues singer Roy Brown was also a major influence on him, and Wilson grew up listening to the Mills Brothers, the Ink Spots, Louis Jordan and Al Jolson.

Wilson was the group's lead singer for three years, but the Dominoes lost some of their stride with the departure of McPhatter. They made appearances riding on the strength of the group's earlier hits, until 1956 when the Dominoes recorded Wilson with an interpretation of the pop hit "St. Therese of the Roses", giving the Dominoes another brief moment in the spotlight. (Their only other post-McPhatter/Wilson successes were "Stardust", released July 15, 1957, and "Deep Purple", released October 7, 1957.) In 1957 Wilson began a solo career, left the Dominoes, collaborated with his cousin Levi, and secured performances at Detroit's Flame Show Bar. Later, Al Green secured a deal with Decca Records, and Wilson was signed to its subsidiary label Brunswick.

Solo stardom

Shortly before Wilson signed a solo contract with Brunswick, Green suddenly died. Green's business partner Nat Tarnopol took over as Wilson's manager (and ultimately rose to president of Brunswick). Wilson's first single was released, "Reet Petite" (from his first album He's So Fine), which became a modest R&B success (many years later, an international smash hit). "Reet Petite" was co-written by future Motown Records founder Berry Gordy Jr. (another former boxer who was a native son of Detroit), with partner Roquel "Billy" Davis (using the pseudonym Tyran Carlo) and Gordy's sister Gwendolyn. The trio composed and produced six additional singles for Wilson: "To Be Loved", "I'm Wanderin'", "We Have Love", "That's Why (I Love You So)", "I'll Be Satisfied", and Wilson's late-1958 signature song, "Lonely Teardrops", which peaked at No. 7 on the pop charts, ranked No. 1 on the R&B charts in the U.S., and established Wilson as an R&B superstar known for his extraordinary, operatic multi-octave vocal range. Wilson's  "Lonely Teardrops" sold over one million copies, and was awarded a gold disc by the RIAA.

Due to Wilson's fervor when performing, with his dynamic dance moves, impassioned singing and fashion sense, he was nicknamed "Mr. Excitement". His stagecraft in his live shows inspired James Brown, Teddy Pendergrass, Michael Jackson and Elvis Presley, as well as a host of other artists that followed. Presley was so impressed with Wilson that he made it a point to meet him, and the two instantly became good friends. In a photo of the two posing together, Presley's caption in the autograph reads "You got you a friend for life". Wilson was sometimes called "The Black Elvis". Reportedly, when asked about this Presley said, "I guess that makes me the white Jackie Wilson." Wilson also said he was influenced by Presley, saying, "A lot of people have accused Elvis of stealing the black man's music, when in fact, almost every black solo entertainer copied his stage mannerisms from Elvis."

Wilson's powerful, electrifying live performances rarely failed to bring audiences to a state of frenzy. His live performances consisted of knee-drops, splits, spins, back-flips, one-footed across-the-floor slides, removing his tie and jacket and throwing them off the stage, basic boxing steps like advance and retreat shuffling, and one of his favorite routines, getting some of the less attractive women in the audience to come up to the stage and kiss him. Wilson often said "if I get the ugliest girl in the audience to come up and kiss me, they'll all think they can have me and keep coming back and buying my records."

Wilson was a regular on TV, making regular appearances on such shows as  The Ed Sullivan Show, American Bandstand, Shindig!, Shivaree and Hullabaloo. His only movie appearance was in the rock and roll film Go, Johnny, Go!, where he performed his 1959 hit song "You Better Know It".

In 1958, Davis and Gordy left Wilson and Brunswick after royalty disputes escalated between them and Nat Tarnopol. Davis soon became a successful staff songwriter and producer for Chess Records, while Gordy borrowed $800 from his family and used money he earned from royalties writing for Wilson to start his own recording studio, Hitsville USA, the foundation of Motown Records in his native Detroit. Meanwhile, convinced that Wilson could venture out of R&B and rock and roll, Tarnopol had the singer record operatic ballads and easy listening material, pairing him with Decca Records' veteran arranger Dick Jacobs.

Wilson scored hits as he entered the 1960s with the No. 15 "Doggin' Around", the No. 4 pop ballad "Night", another million-seller, and "Baby Workout", another Top 10 hit (No. 5), which he composed with The Midnighters member Alonzo Tucker. His songwriting alliance with Tucker also turned out other songs, including "No Pity (In The Naked City)" and "I'm So Lonely." Top 10 hits continued with "Alone at Last" (No. 8 in 1960) and "My Empty Arms" (No. 9 in 1961).

Also in 1961, Wilson recorded a tribute album to Al Jolson, Nowstalgia ... You Ain't Heard Nothin' Yet, which included the only album liner notes he ever wrote: "... to the greatest entertainer of this or any other era ... I guess I have just about every recording he's ever made, and I rarely missed listening to him on the radio ... During the three years I've been making records, I've had the ambition to do an album of songs, which, to me, represent the great Jolson heritage ... This is simply my humble tribute to the one man I admire most in this business ... to keep the heritage of Jolson alive." The album was a commercial failure.

Following the success of "Baby Workout", Wilson experienced a lull in his career between 1964 and 1966 as Tarnopol and Brunswick Records released a succession of unsuccessful albums and singles. Despite the lack of sales success, Wilson still made artistic gains as he recorded an album with Count Basie, as well as a series of duets with R & B artist LaVern Baker and gospel singer Linda Hopkins.

In 1966, Wilson scored the first of two big comeback singles with the established Chicago soul producer Carl Davis with "Whispers (Gettin' Louder)" and "(Your Love Keeps Lifting Me) Higher and Higher", the latter a No. 6 pop hit in 1967 that became one of his final hits. "I Get the Sweetest Feeling", despite its modest initial chart success in the US (Billboard Pop No. 34), has since become one of his biggest international chart successes, ranking in Top 10 twice in the UK (in 1972 and 1987), and in the Top 20 of the Dutch Top 40. "I Get the Sweetest Feeling" spawned numerous cover versions by other artists such as Edwin Starr, Will Young, Erma Franklin (Aretha Franklin's sister) and Liz McClarnon.

A key to Wilson's musical rebirth was Davis insisting that he no longer record with Brunswick's musicians in New York; instead, he recorded with Detroit musicians normally employed by Motown Records and also Davis' own Chicago-based session players. The Detroit musicians, known as the Funk Brothers, participated on Wilson's recordings due to their respect for Davis and Wilson.

By 1975, Wilson and the Chi-Lites were the only significant artists left on Brunswick's roster. Wilson had continued to record singles that found success on the R&B chart, but found no significant pop chart success. His final hit, "You Got Me Walkin'", written by Eugene Record of the Chi-Lites, was released in 1972 with the Chi-Lites backing him on vocals and instruments.

Illness and death
According to Larry Geller, who visited Wilson backstage in Las Vegas with Elvis Presley, the singer had a habit of taking a handful of salt tablets and drinking large amounts of water before each performance, to create profuse sweating. Wilson told Elvis Presley, "The chicks love it." 

On September 29, 1975, Wilson was one of the featured acts in Dick Clark's Good Ol' Rock and Roll Revue, hosted by the Latin Casino in Cherry Hill, New Jersey. He was in the middle of singing "Lonely Teardrops" when he suffered a massive heart attack. On the words "My heart is crying" he collapsed on stage; audience members applauded as they initially thought it was part of the act. Clark sensed something was wrong, then ordered the musicians to stop the music. Cornell Gunter of the Coasters, who was backstage, noticed Wilson was not breathing. Gunter was able to resuscitate him and Wilson was then rushed to a nearby hospital.

Medical personnel worked to stabilize Wilson's vital signs, but the lack of oxygen to his brain caused him to slip into a coma. He briefly recovered in early 1976, and was even able to take a few wobbly steps, but slipped back into a semi-comatose state.

Wilson's friend, fellow singer Bobby Womack, planned a benefit at the Hollywood Palladium to raise funds for Wilson on March 4. Wilson was deemed conscious but incapacitated in early June 1976, unable to speak but aware of his surroundings. He was a resident of the Medford Leas Retirement Center in Medford, New Jersey, when he was admitted into Memorial Hospital of Burlington County in Mount Holly, New Jersey, due to having trouble taking nourishment, according to his attorney John Mulkerin. Elvis Presley covered a large portion of Wilson’s medical bills. Wilson's friend Joyce McRae tried to become his caregiver while he was in a nursing home, but he was placed in the guardianship of his estranged wife Harlean Harris and her lawyer John Mulkerin in 1978.

Wilson died on January 21, 1984, at the age of 49 from complications of pneumonia. He was initially buried in an unmarked grave at Westlawn Cemetery near Detroit. 

In 1987, fans raised money in a fundraiser spearheaded by an Orlando disc jockey "Jack the Rapper" Gibson to purchase a mausoleum. On June 9, 1987,  his 53rd birthday, a ceremony was held and Wilson was interred in the mausoleum at Westlawn Cemetery in Wayne, Michigan. His mother Eliza Wilson, who died in 1975, was also placed in the mausoleum.

Personal life
Wilson converted to Judaism as an adult. He recorded a version of Lew Pollack and Jack Yellen's famed Jewish-themed song "My Yiddishe Momme" in New York in November 1960.

Wilson had a reputation for being short-tempered and promiscuous. In her autobiography, Patti LaBelle accused Wilson of sexually assaulting her backstage at a Brooklyn theater in the early 1960s.

On February 15, 1961, in Manhattan, Wilson was shot and seriously wounded by a woman named Juanita Jones. Jones was one of his girlfriends, and she shot him in a jealous rage after he returned to his Manhattan apartment with another woman, fashion model Harlean Harris, an ex-girlfriend of Sam Cooke. Wilson's management supposedly concocted the story about her being a jealous fan to protect Wilson's reputation. They claimed that Jones was an obsessed fan who had threatened to shoot herself, and that Wilson's intervention resulted in his being shot. Wilson was shot in the stomach; the bullet resulted in the loss of a kidney, and lodged too close to his spine to be removed. 

In early 1975, during an interview with author Arnold Shaw, Wilson maintained it actually was a zealous fan he did not know who shot him. "We also had some trouble in 1961. That was when some crazy chick took a shot at me and nearly put me away for good..." No charges were brought against Jones.

Legal problems 
In 1960, Wilson was arrested and charged with assaulting a police officer when fans tried to climb on stage in New Orleans. He assaulted a policeman who had shoved one of the fans.

In 1964, Wilson jumped from a second floor window at Kiel Auditorium in St. Louis to avoid being arrested after a show. His arrest stemmed from a default of a $2,200 contract judgement in which he failed to appear at The Riviera Club in 1959. He was caught by the police and jailed for a day before he posted a $3,000 bond.

In March 1967, Wilson and his drummer, Jimmy Smith, were arrested in South Carolina on "morals charges"; the two were entertaining two 24-year-old white women in their motel room.

Financial issues 
In 1961, Wilson declared annual earnings of $263,000, while the average annual salary at that time was just $5,000, but he discovered that, despite being at the peak of success, he was broke. Around this time the Internal Revenue Service (IRS) seized Wilson's Detroit family home. Tarnopol and his accountants were supposed to take care of such matters. Wilson made arrangements with the IRS to make restitution on the unpaid taxes; he also re-purchased the family home at auction. Nat Tarnopol had taken advantage of Wilson's naïveté, mismanaging his money since becoming his manager. Tarnopol also had power of attorney over Wilson's finances.

Tarnopol and 18 other Brunswick executives were indicted on federal charges of mail fraud and tax evasion stemming from bribery and payola scandals in 1975. Also in the indictment was the charge that Tarnopol owed at least $1 million in royalties to Wilson. In 1976 Tarnopol and the others were found guilty; an appeals court overturned their conviction 18 months later. Although the conviction was overturned, judges went into detail, outlining that Tarnopol and Brunswick Records did defraud their artists of royalties, and that they were satisfied that there was sufficient evidence for Wilson to file a lawsuit. However, a trial to sue Tarnopol for royalties never took place, as Wilson lay in a nursing home semi-comatose. Tarnopol never paid Wilson monies he had coming to him, and Wilson died owing money to Brunswick Records and an estimated $300,000 to the IRS.

Marriages and children 
At the age of 17, Wilson married his girlfriend Freda Hood in 1951 while she was pregnant. Together they had four children: Jacqueline Denise (1951-1988), Sandra Kay (1953-1977), Jack Leroy Jr (1954-1970), and Anthony Duane. Hood divorced Wilson in 1965, after 14 years of marriage, as she was frustrated with his notorious womanizing.

In 1967, Wilson married his second wife, model Harlean Harris (1937–2019), at the urging of Nat Tarnopol, who thought the marriage would help repair Wilson's public image. They had been dating since at least 1960, and had a son, John Dominick (known as Petey), born in 1963. Wilson and Harris legally separated in 1969. 

Wilson was in a relationship with a woman named Lynn Guidry, who was under the impression that she was his legal wife, until his heart attack in 1975. However, Wilson and Harris never officially divorced. Harris became his court-appointed guardian in 1978.

Wilson's 16-year-old son, Jackie Jr, was shot and killed on a neighbor's porch near their Detroit home in 1970. Wilson sank into a period of depression, and for the next few years remained mostly a recluse. He turned to drug abuse and continued drinking in an attempt to cope with the loss of his son. More tragedy hit when two of Wilson's daughters died when young. His daughter Sandra died in 1977 at the age of 24 of an apparent heart attack. His eldest daughter, Jacqueline, was killed in 1988 in a drug-related incident in Highland Park, Michigan.

Wilson also fathered many other children out of wedlock with different women, including singer Bobby Brooks Wilson who performs his father's songs in tribute.

Tributes and legacy
Van Morrison recorded a tribute song called "Jackie Wilson Said (I'm in Heaven When You Smile)" on his 1972 album Saint Dominic's Preview. It was covered by Dexys Midnight Runners in 1982.

After Wilson's death, Michael Jackson paid tribute to him at the 1984 Grammy Awards. Jackson dedicated his Album of the Year Grammy for Thriller to Wilson, saying, "Some people are entertainers and some people are great entertainers. Some people are followers. And some people make the path and are pioneers. I'd like to say Jackie Wilson was a wonderful entertainer. He's not with us anymore, but Jackie, where you are I'd like to say, I love you and thank you so much."

In 1985, the Commodores recorded "Nightshift" in memory of Wilson and soul singer Marvin Gaye, who had both died in 1984.

Wilson scored a posthumous hit in Europe when "Reet Petite" topped the charts in the Netherlands, the Republic of Ireland and the United Kingdom in 1986. This success was likely due in part to a new animated video made for the song, featuring a clay model of Wilson, that became popular on the BBC Two TV network in the latter country. The following year, Wilson's posthumous charting success in the United Kingdom continued when he hit the UK Singles Chart again with "I Get the Sweetest Feeling" (number three), and "(Your Love Keeps Lifting Me) Higher and Higher" (number 15).

In Berry Gordy's 1994 autobiography To Be Loved (named for one of the hit tunes he wrote for Wilson) Motown founder Berry Gordy stated that Wilson was "The greatest singer I've ever heard. The epitome of natural greatness. Unfortunately for some, he set the standard I'd be looking for in singers forever".

In 1994, Peter Tork of The Monkees recorded a bluegrass-rock cover of "Higher and Higher" on his first solo album Stranger Things Have Happened, having previously self-released a single featuring it in 1981. The song remained Tork's signature solo number in subsequent Monkees concert tours.

In the 2010 VH1 television special, Say It Loud: A Celebration of Black Music in America, Smokey Robinson and Bobby Womack both paid tribute to Wilson. Smokey explained that "Jackie Wilson was the most dynamic singer and performer that I think I've ever seen." Bobby added "He was the real Elvis Presley, as far as I'm concerned...and Elvis took a lot from him too."

In 2010, Wilson's songs "(Your Love Keeps Lifting Me) Higher and Higher" and "Lonely Teardrops" were ranked No. 248 and No. 315  on Rolling Stone magazine's list of the 500 Greatest Songs of All Time.

In 2014, artist Hozier released a song titled "Jackie and Wilson", a play on Wilson's name. The song includes the lyrics "We'll name our children Jackie and Wilson and raise them on rhythm and blues."

In 2016, Cottage Grove Street in Detroit was renamed Jackie Wilson Lane in his honor.

In 2018, Hologram USA Networks Inc. launched the hologram stage show, Higher & Higher: The Jackie Wilson Story.

During their 2019-20 season, "(Your Love Keeps Lifting Me) Higher and Higher" was played following every home win by the St. Louis Blues.

Portrayals in the media 
In 1987, Wilson was portrayed in the Ritchie Valens biographical film La Bamba by Howard Huntsberry.

In 1992, Wilson was portrayed in the ABC miniseries by Grady Harrell in The Jacksons: An American Dream.

In 1999, Wilson was portrayed by Leon Robinson in the NBC television film Mr. Rock 'n' Roll: The Alan Freed Story.

In 1999, Wilson was portrayed by Sananda Maitreya, then known professionally as Terence Trent D'Arby, in the television film Shake, Rattle & Roll.

In 2000, Wilson was portrayed by Chester Gregory in the Black Ensemble Theater of Chicago's musical production about Wilson's life.

In 2019, Wilson was portrayed by Jeremy Pope in One Night in Miami....

Awards and nominations 
 1987: Wilson was inducted into the Rock and Roll Hall of Fame
2003: Wilson was honored with the Rhythm and Blues Foundation Legacy Tribute Award
 2005: Wilson was voted into the Michigan Rock and Roll Legends Hall of Fame
 2013: Wilson was inducted into the R&B Music Hall of Fame
 2019: Wilson was honored with a star on the Hollywood Walk of Fame

Grammy Awards 
Wilson was nominated for two Grammy Awards. In 1999, his songs "Higher and Higher" and "Lonely Teardrops" were inducted into the Grammy Hall of Fame. 

|-
| 1968
| "Higher and Higher"
| Best R&B Solo Vocal Performance, Male
| 
|-
| 1961
| "Lonely Teardrops"
| Best Rhythm & Blues Performance
|

Selected discography

Studio albums 
 1958: He's So Fine
 1959: Lonely Teardrops
 1959: So Much
 1960: Jackie Sings the Blues
 1960: A Woman, a Lover, a Friend 
 1961:You Ain't Heard Nothin' Yet 
 1961: By Special Request 
 1962: Body and Soul 
 1962: Jackie Wilson at the Copa 
 1963: Jackie Wilson Sings the World's Greatest Melodies 
 1963: Baby Workout 
 1963: Shake a Hand (with Linda Hopkins)
 1964: Somethin' Else!!! 
 1965: Soul Time 
 1965: Spotlight on Jackie Wilson! 
 1966: Whispers 
 1967: Higher and Higher 
 1968: Manufacturers of Soul (with Count Basie)
 1968: I Get the Sweetest Feeling 
 1969: Do Your Thing
 1970: This Love is Real
 1971: You Got Me Walkin
 1972: It's All A Part Of love
 1973: Beautiful Day
 1974: Nowstalgia
 1976: Nobody But You

References

External links

 Jackie Wilson recordings at the Discography of American Historical Recordings.

 

1934 births
1984 deaths
20th-century African-American male singers
American soul singers
Doo-wop musicians
Rock and roll musicians
American shooting survivors
African-American Jews
Converts to Judaism
Jewish American musicians
Deaths from pneumonia in New Jersey
The Midnighters members
Musicians from Detroit
People with severe brain damage
Singers with a three-octave vocal range
Federal Records artists
King Records artists
Brunswick Records artists
20th-century American singers
Burials in Michigan
20th-century American male singers
People with disorders of consciousness